Leandro Carlos Messineo (born 13 September 1979 in Olavarría) is an Argentine cyclist, who currently rides for UCI Continental team .

Major results

2010
 1st Stage 3 Vuelta al Ecuador
 National Road Championships
2nd Road race
3rd Time trial
2011
 1st  Time trial, Pan American Road Championships
 1st  Time trial, National Road Championships
 1st Stage 5 Tour de San Luis
 5th Time trial, Pan American Games
2012
 Vuelta a Bolivia
1st Points classification
1st Stage 2
 6th Overall Tour do Brasil
2013
 1st  Time trial, National Road Championships
 1st  Sprints classification Tour de San Luis
 1st Stage 3 (TTT) Vuelta a Bolivia
 3rd  Time trial, Pan American Road Championships
2014
 8th Time trial, South American Games
2015
 9th Overall Tour de San Luis
2016
 4th Time trial, National Road Championships
2022
 4th Overall Vuelta del Porvenir San Luis
2023
 8th Overall Giro del Sol
1st Stage 2

References

External links

1979 births
Living people
Argentine male cyclists